Charles Seely may refer to:

 Charles Seely (politician, born 1803), British industrialist and Liberal Member of Parliament
 Sir Charles Seely, 1st Baronet (1833–1915), British Member of Parliament, son of the above
 Sir Charles Seely, 2nd Baronet (1859–1926), British Member of Parliament, son of the above